The first Djerad government (Arabic: حكومة جراد الأولى) is the forty-sixth government of the People's Democratic Republic of Algeria. It is a government formed by Abdelaziz Djerad on 2 January 2020 under President Abdelmadjid Tebboune.

Formation 
After holding the elections that the Army was betting on in order to end the protests, and the announcement of Abdelmadjid Tebboune's victory and his inauguration as President, the unsurprising resignation of Noureddine Bedoui came.

The First Minister Noureddine Bedoui submitted the resignation of his government on 19 December 2019, which the new President Abdelmadjid Tebboune accepted. At the same day, the TV1 has announced that the Minister of Foreign Affairs Sabri Boukadoum was named as acting First Minister by the President.

On 29 December 2019, the President of the Republic has appointed the Professor Abdelaziz Djerad as First Minister to form a new government. The composition of the government was announced on 2 January 2020 by Belaïd Mohand-Oussaïd, Spokesman of the Presidency, with a number of ministers from the previous one retained.

Composition

Ministers

Deputy Ministers

Secretaries of State

Secretary General

References 

Government of Algeria